Xanthotis is a genus of birds in the honeyeater family Meliphagidae.

The genus contains three species:
 Spotted honeyeater (Xanthotis polygrammus)
 Macleay's honeyeater (Xanthotis macleayanus)
 Tawny-breasted honeyeater (Xanthotis flaviventer)

The Kadavu honeyeater (Meliphacator provocator) was formerly included in this genus. It was moved to its own genus Meliphacator based on the results of a molecular phylogenetic study published in 2019.

References

 
Bird genera
Taxonomy articles created by Polbot
Taxa named by Ludwig Reichenbach